Capt. Joginder Singh was an Indian athlete who won the Arjuna award in 1968.

References

Indian male shot putters
Recipients of the Arjuna Award
Asian Games gold medalists for India
Asian Games bronze medalists for India
Asian Games medalists in athletics (track and field)
Athletes (track and field) at the 1962 Asian Games
Athletes (track and field) at the 1966 Asian Games
Athletes (track and field) at the 1970 Asian Games
Medalists at the 1962 Asian Games
Medalists at the 1966 Asian Games
Medalists at the 1970 Asian Games